Mirela Bojescu  (born ) is a retired Romanian female volleyball player. She was part of the Romania women's national volleyball team.

She participated at the 1994 FIVB Volleyball Women's World Championship in Brazil. On club level she played with Etiflex Ommen.

Clubs
 Etiflex Ommen (1994)

References

1965 births
Living people
Romanian women's volleyball players
Place of birth missing (living people)